is a Japanese owarai comedy duo consisting of Osamu Shitara and Yūki Himura.

Career
Shitara and Himura formed as a comedy unit in 1993 and debuted on stage in 1994. Himura had broken up with his previous partner and Shitara was working as the driver of the comedian Masayuki Watanabe, so they formed a duo after a friend introduced them. They concentrated on  skit comedy, developing a theatrical style that emphasized verbal repartee. 

In 2008, they came in second on the nationally televised annual King of Conte skit comedy contest. Up until then, Bananaman had concentrated on live performances and DVD releases, but afterwards began to appear more on television. Himura appeared on the most shows (19) of any comedian during the 2009 New Year's period, and the duo received their own show, Banana Fire, for the first time in April 2009. After that, they became the hosts of several other television shows, including Nogizaka tte Doko? and its successor Nogizaka Kojichū (with Nogizaka46), Banana-juku, and Why Did You Come to Japan?, in addition to appearing as regulars on other shows like Beat Takeshi's Unbelievable. Shitara and Himura also appear by themselves on various programs, with Shitara, for instance, hosting the live news program Nonstop!. 

Bananaman have also appeared in acting roles on film and television (for instance, Shitara in Kakusho ~ Keishicho Sōsa 3 Ka). In the year 2012, Shitara appeared on more television programs than any other Japanese personality, appearing in 611 programs, 163 with Himura (Himura was ranked 12th with 428 television appearances). Shitara also led the rankings for the first half of 2013.

The duo are the hosts of Nogizaka's weekly late night variety show, Nogizaka Kojichū, and will occasionally mention the girls in their radio show, BananaMoon Gold. Many Nogizaka46 members also say they listen to Bananaman's radio show and follow their schedules. The two acts often appear in each other's events and regular shows.

Members 
, born April 23, 1973, in Minano, Saitama
, born May 14, 1972, in Hiroshima, and moved to Sagamihara, Kanagawa at the age of 3

Television

Radio

References

External links

 HoriPro com official Homepage

Japanese comedy duos